Giuseppe Sirianni (18 April 1874 – 13 August 1955) was an Italian admiral, minister of the navy from 12 September 1929 to 6 November 1933; as such, he was one of the key figures of the Regia Marina during the interwar period and the Fascist regime. He was also a member of the Italian Senate from 1926 to 1929.

Biography
Born in Genoa, after graduating from the Livorno Naval Academy he was sent to China in 1900 as a lieutenant in the naval infantry of the Regia Marina, participating in the suppression of the Boxer Rebellion. He participated in the Italo-Turkish War as commander of the torpedo boat Perseo, participating in Enrico Millo's raid on the Dardanelles in 1912 and being promoted to lieutenant commander for war merit. During the First World War he was in command of the destroyer Impetuoso and later, with the rank of Commander, of the scout cruiser Nino Bixio. In June 1918 he commanded the Naval Infantry Regiment during the Second Battle of the Piave River. Altogether, he received two Silver Medals for Military Valor and three War Merit Crosses for his wartime service; for his role in the Battle of Vittorio Veneto he was promoted to Captain and made an Officer of the Military Order of Savoy.

From April to June 1920 he was President of the Naval Tribunal of La Spezia; from 1 December 1923 to 3 March 1925 he served as Commander of the Mechanic's School of Venice and from 6 March to 9 May 1925 he was Secretary of the Superior Council of the Navy. A friend of Costanzo Ciano, he was promoted to rear admiral in March 1925, and on 14 May 1925 he was appointed Undersecretary of the Ministry of the Navy in the Mussolini Cabinet, serving as de facto Minister of the Navy (the titular minister being Mussolini himself). Having joined the National Fascist Party, he became Senator of the Kingdom on May 24, 1926, and Minister of the Navy on September 12, 1929, with the rank of admiral, holding the position until November 5, 1933. Shortly afterwards he was appointed president of the Cogne steel mill company, and retired from political life in 1935. On January 29, 1940 he was promoted to admiral of the fleet.

In August 1945, after the end of the Second World War, he was referred to the High Court of Justice for Sanctions against Fascism as a senator appointed during the Fascist regime, but the request for conviction was rejected. He died in Pieve Ligure in 1955.

References

External links

1874 births
1955 deaths
Italian military personnel of World War I
Italian admirals
Recipients of the Silver Medal of Military Valor
Italian Ministers of Defence
Mussolini Cabinet
Military personnel from Genoa
Regia Marina personnel